The Robert Morris Colonials women represented Robert Morris University in CHA women's ice hockey during the 2013-14 NCAA Division I women's ice hockey season. The Colonials finished conference play in second place, and were eliminated in the first round of the CHA Tournament by RIT.

Offseason
April 11: Former Goaltender Brianne McLaughlin earned a gold medal with the US team at the IIHF World Championships.

Standings

Roster

2013–14 Colonials

Schedule

|-
!colspan=12 style=" "| Regular Season

|-
!colspan=12 style=" "|CHA Tournament

Awards and honors

Brittany Howard and Jessica Dodds were named to the USCHO All-Rookie Team

References

Robert Morris
Robert Morris Lady Colonials ice hockey seasons
Robert
Robert